Ronald Reagan was the 33rd governor of California for two terms, the first beginning in 1967 and the second in 1971. He left office in 1975, declining to run for a third term. Robert Finch, Edwin Reinecke and John L. Harmer served as lieutenant governors over the course of his governorship.

1966 nomination and election

California Republicans were impressed with Reagan's conservative political views and charisma after his "A Time for Choosing" speech for the Goldwater presidential campaign in 1964.  David S. Broder called it “the most successful national political debut since William Jennings Bryan electrified the 1896 Democratic convention with  the ‘Cross of Gold’ speech." Reagan assembled advisors and financiers, and in late 1965 he announced his campaign for governor in the 1966 election.  Incumbent Governor Pat Brown intervened indirectly in the Republican primary to undermine former San Francisco mayor George Christopher, thinking that Reagan, as a politically inexperienced movie actor, would be easier to beat. Christopher lost. Against Brown, Reagan emphasized two main themes: "to send the welfare bums back to work," and, in reference to burgeoning anti-war and anti-establishment student protests at the University of California, Berkeley, "to clean up the mess at Berkeley." He was elected to his first term on November 8, 1966, with more than 57% of the vote, defeating the two-term incumbent governor by nearly a million votes. 

Reagan was sworn in on January 2, 1967 at ten minutes past midnight—starting early to prevent Brown from naming judges at the last minute.

First term (1967–1971)

Staffing
Reagan's efficiency as governor depended on his three support groups. His high visibility Hollywood supporters included Bob Hope, Jack Benny, Dinah Shore, George Burns, James Cagney, John Wayne and Jimmy Stewart, as well as producers Walt Disney and Taft B. Schreiber of MCA.  His campaign was managed by the well-known firm of Spencer and Roberts.  Funding came from California businessman and financiers including Union Oil chief executive A.C. “Cy” Rubel; auto dealer  Holmes Tuttle; Henry Salvatori; Alfred S. Bloomingdale; Leonard Firestone; and Justin Dart. The governor's key staffers included chief of staff Philip Battaglia, Lyn Nofziger, Thomas C. Reed, William P. Clark Jr., Edwin Meese, Michael Deaver, and personal lawyer William French Smith. Nancy Reagan, the foundation of his emotional support, was the most important member of the team.

When his advisers discovered that chief of staff Battaglia was an active homosexual partnering with junior staff, nine went to Reagan as a group and demanded Battaglia be fired.  Reagan was relatively at ease with the gay community in Hollywood, but the California electorate was less tolerant. Reagan chose Clark to replace Battaglia, and the story lost momentum.

Tax cuts
Reagan campaigned as a tax cutter, promising to squeeze, cut, and trim. Once in office he froze government hiring but increased spending by 9%. He worked with Democrat Jess Unruh, the Assembly Speaker, to secure a series of tax increases that raised rates and balanced the budget, while also cutting property taxes.  The sales tax was raised from 3% to 5%. The highest income tax bracket saw a rise from 7% tax to 10%. Taxes on banks, corporate profits, and inheritance were increased slightly. Liquor taxes jumped from $1.50 to $2.00 per gallon; and cigarette taxes from three cents to ten cents per pack.

Abortion issue
Early in 1967, the national debate on abortion was beginning and attention was being focused on California. The American Medical Association, the American Bar Association, the American Academy of Pediatrics, the California Medical Association, the California Bar Association, and numerous other groups announced support behind new laws that would protect doctors from criminal prosecution if they performed abortions under rigid hospital controls.  A bipartisan majority in the California legislature supported a new law introduced by Democratic state senator Anthony Beilenson, the "Therapeutic Abortion Act". Catholic clergy were strongly opposed but Catholic lay people were divided and non-Catholics strongly supported the proposal. Reagan consulted with his father-in-law, a prominent surgeon who supported the law.  He also consulted with James Cardinal McIntyre, the Catholic archbishop of Los Angeles. The archbishop strongly opposed any legalization of abortion and he convinced Reagan to announce he would veto the proposed law since the draft allowed abortions in the case of birth defects. The legislature dropped that provision and Reagan signed the law, which decriminalized abortions when done to protect the health of the mother.  The expectation was that abortions would not become more numerous but would become much safer under hospital conditions.  In 1968, which was the first full year under the new law, there were 5,018 abortions in California. The numbers grew exponentially and stabilized at about 100,000 annually by the 1970s. Elective abortions were legal, as 99.2% of women who requested an abortion received treatment. One out of every three pregnancies was ended by illegal abortion.  The key factor was the sudden emergence of a woman's movement that introduced a very new idea—women had a basic right to control their bodies and could choose to have an abortion or not. Reagan by 1980 found his support among anti-abortion religious groups and said he was too new as governor to make a wise decision.

Berkeley protests

Reagan was involved in high-profile conflicts with the protest movements of the era.  During his campaign, he repeatedly promised to "clean up the mess at Berkeley" in response to the Free Speech Movement of 1964.  He followed through on that promise by appointing several new regents to the UC Board of Regents who, together with himself (in his capacity as an ex officio regent) aligned with existing board members to form a majority (14 to 8) to vote for UC President Clark Kerr's dismissal on January 20, 1967.  In a February 3, 1967 letter to Kerr, Regent Thomas M. Storke criticized the "brutal, cruel, and asinine" manner in which Reagan had carried out Kerr's dismissal and also noted that "Ananias is a symbol of Truth compared to Ronnie."

On May 15, 1969, during the People's Park protests at UC Berkeley, Reagan sent the California Highway Patrol and other officers to quell the protests, in an incident that became known as "Bloody Thursday." The student newspaper headlines blared: 
POLICE  SEIZE PARK; SHOOT AT LEAST 35; March Triggers Ave. Gassing; Bystanders, Students Wounded; Emergency, Curfew Enforced.  
Reagan then called out 2,200 state National Guard troops to occupy the city of Berkeley for two weeks in order to crack down on the protesters. W.J. Rorabaugh argues that Reagan was unable to break the power of liberal faculty and administrators, or of radical students.  However those groups were astonished by Reagan's popularity, and drastically underestimated the force of conservative reaction against higher education.

China issue
Reagan, as governor and later as president, had been a supporter of Taiwan. Following a 1971 vote in the United Nations in which several delegates voted against the US and decided to recognize the People’s Republic of China, Reagan, in a call to President Nixon, vented his anger at the Tanzanian delegation: "To see those... monkeys from those African countries—damn them, they're still uncomfortable wearing shoes." Nixon told his deputy national security adviser Alexander Haig to cancel any future meetings with any African leader who had not voted with the United States on Taiwan.

Presidential campaign
Shortly after the beginning of his term, Reagan tested the presidential waters in 1968 as part of a "Stop Nixon" movement, hoping to cut into Nixon's Southern support and be a compromise candidate if neither Nixon nor second-place Nelson Rockefeller received enough delegates to win on the first ballot at the Republican convention.  However, by the time of the convention Nixon had 692 delegate votes, 25 more than he needed to secure the nomination, followed by Rockefeller with Reagan in third place.

Republican Governors Association chairmanship
In December 1968, Reagan was elected chair of the Republican Governors Association, succeeding John Chafee. He remained in the role until he was succeeded by Raymond P. Shafer in December 1969.

Second term (1971–1975)

An unsuccessful attempt to recall Reagan in 1968 was supported by senior citizens, educators, and organized labor.  Reagan was re-elected in 1970, defeating "Big Daddy" Jesse M. Unruh on November 3 with 52.85% of the vote.  He chose not to seek a third term in the following election cycle.

Capital punishment
One of Reagan's greatest frustrations in office concerned capital punishment, which he strongly supported.  His efforts to enforce the state's laws in this area were thwarted when the Supreme Court of California issued its People v. Anderson decision, which invalidated all death sentences issued in California prior to 1972, though the decision was later overturned by a constitutional amendment. The only execution during Reagan's governorship was on April 12, 1967, when Aaron Mitchell's sentence was carried out by the state in San Quentin's gas chamber. The execution of convicted murderer Robert Lee Massie was nearly carried out during Reagan's governorship but was stayed in 1967 by Reagan himself because he wanted Massie to attend the trial of his alleged accomplice. Massie would be executed over three decades later for a separate murder in 2001.

School finance reform
The 1971 state supreme court decision in  Serrano v. Priest required the state to equalize spending on schools between rich and poor districts. Facing a strong Democratic opposition in the legislature, Reagan negotiated compromises with Speaker Bob Moretti that would be attractive to key elements of the Republican base.  He cut deals with Moretti, who wanted to satisfy his Democratic base and also build a leadership image as he planned to run for governor himself in 1974. Reagan's strategy was to keep costs down, cut property taxes for homeowners, limit school spending, and provide higher spending for poorer school districts. For support, he looked to Republicans, business groups, the school lobby, and some Assembly Democrats.  The final legislation as signed by the governor included the main provision of a new annual grant of $454 million to local school districts, of which $229 million was to reduce school tax rates and $220 million was to supplement existing school aid for poor districts.  Special assistance of $83 million was allocated to inner-city schools, a Democratic constituency. In addition, there were side payments to keep other elements happy.  The property tax exemption for homeowners was raised from $750 to $1750; this was a Republican constituency. Renters—a major Democratic constituency—received an income tax credit of $25 to $45.  Businesses—a Republican constituency—received a cut in the property tax on their inventories.  Local governments were paid an extra $7 million a year to set aside open space. This appealed to local officials of both parties and to the new environmentalist movement which at the time was bipartisan.  Educators were pleased with  $40 million for early childhood education.  To pay for all of this, the state sales tax was raised from 5.0% to 6.0%. Corporate income tax went up from 7.6% to 9.0% for corporations and from 11.6% to 13.0% for banks. In addition to new taxes some federal money was used, as well as increased revenue from older taxes.  Reagan insisted on adding a major restriction: local governments and school districts could not raise taxes without voter approval.  Liberals were upset but agreed to the restriction. As it happened, property values went up steadily and the same rates produced more dollars every year.  The result was a victory for both Reagan and Moretti. It gave the governor a reputation for successful deal-making that pleased multiple constituencies.  At the same time, Reagan's public rhetoric appealed to hard-line conservatives nationally, his actions in Sacramento appealed to moderates.

California Proposition 1
After a string of successes climaxed by a reelection landslide, Reagan in 1973 set his eye on national issues in the 1976 presidential election. He decided his signature issue would be to show America he was a hard-liner on cutting taxes and spending by locking that proposition into the California state constitution through Proposition 1--an initiative that would be on the November 1973 ballot. It cut the state tax and made it more difficult to increase rates. He overreached. Michael Deaver ran the campaign, but since the ballot initiative specified all the details, there was no room to negotiate nor compromise with the opposition. The opposition was led by  Assembly Speaker Bob Moretti who forged a coalition of Democratic activists, labor unions, the League of Women Voters, and other organizations. The need to cut state taxes was never clearly presented. Proposition 1 went down to defeat with 54% opposing the measure.

Legacy

Education
According to Curtis Marez,  Reagan became governor partly by vilifying the University of California system, especially Berkeley, as:
sites of radical anticapitalist, antiwar, and anti-heteronormative politics....he raised fees at state colleges and universities, repeatedly slashed construction budgets for state campuses, and engineered the firing of University of California...president Clark Kerr and the firing of Angela Davis from UCLA.

Education spending increased significantly under the Reagan administration contrary to promises to slash education spending despite demanding annually demanding 20 percent across-the-board cuts in higher
education funding. State spending on K-12 schools rose 105% to $2.371 billion from 1966-1967 to 1974-1975. Within California's higher education system from 1966-1967 to 1974-1975, the budget of the University of California system rose 105% to $493 million, the California State University system's budget rose 164% to $480  million, and community college spending rose 323% to $315 million. Student scholarships and loans rose 915% to $43 million. Enrollments also rose, increasing by 5% in K-12, by 44% in the University of California system, by 78% in the California State University system, and by 84% in the community college system.

Shirley Boes Neill concludes the Reagan Administration had many faces:
 It used what some considered inflammatory rhetoric and seemed rigid, but in actual dealings, it impressed many observers as flexible and willing to compromise.  [An anonymous Democrat] said, "The Reagan Administration vented a lot of right-wing  rhetoric to please its supporters and  took the conservative position on certain  enduring controversies...but in  day-to-day dealings with the legislature,  the Reagan staff was generally reasonable,  always accessible, and they made and kept bargains."  Perhaps Wilson Riles [Superintendent of Education] summed up  Reagan best with this analysis: "When  you got down to working with him, he  was far more reasonable than you would  expect from the rhetoric.Welfare
Reagan's terms as governor helped to shape the policies he would pursue in his later political career as president. By campaigning on a platform of sending "the welfare bums back to work", he spoke out against the idea of the welfare state.  He also strongly advocated for less government regulation of the economy and against what he believed to be undue federal taxation. With his eye on national politics, Governor Reagan opposed the negative income tax policy recommended by Presidents Richard Nixon and Jimmy Carter and developed by Milton Friedman.  He offered as an alternative the California Welfare Reform Act (CWRA).

Reagan's rhetoric about "welfare queens" suggested fraud was a major concern. He believed that increased welfare led to more illegitimate babies. However, his fears were not supported by the findings of scholarly analysis of the fertility of women receiving Aid to Families with Dependent Children funds. Women did not bear more children when aid was increased, or less when it was decreased. Instead availability of legal abortions—which Reagan supported as governor—seems to be a factor in decreased births to welfare recipients, and the factors of low education, recent migration to the state, and a welfare childhood experience were more closely related to pregnancies.

Reagan's welfare reform, according to historian Garin Burbank, was a modest success:
[A] a policy that increased grants to the clearly eligible (Reagan's "truly needy"), reduced fraud, pursued absconding fathers of illegitimate children, and praised the example of steady, reliable work habits could be considered a modest success, if not exactly the social miracle that soon appeared in some of Reagan's campaign speeches. Reagan's success lay somewhere between the symbolic and the substantial, in the domain of politics, the one shining dominion that he surely wished to  master.

Historian Kevin Starr ranks Reagan alongside Hiram Johnson, Earl Warren, and Pat Brown as "great governors" of California.  Starr ranks Reagan so high because of his sustained "good-humored relations with key Democrats .. . ," and because, after listening to the latter, he "gave Californians the biggest tax hike in their history--and got away with it."

See also
 Electoral history of Ronald Reagan
 Presidency of Ronald Reagan

Notes

Further reading

 Alvarado, Alice L. "Ronald Reagan, Jesse Unruh and the California Gubernatorial Race, 1970," Bound Away: The Liberty Journal of History  (2018) 2#2: 1-20 online
 Anderson, Totton J.; Lee, Eugene C. (1967), "The 1966 Election in California", Western Political Quarterly, 20#2 pp. 535–554 in JSTOR
 Anderson, Totton J., and Charles G. Bell. "The 1970 Election in California." Western Political Quarterly 24.2 (1971): 252-273.
 Becker, Jules, and Douglas A. Fuchs. "How two major California dailies covered Reagan vs. Brown." Journalism Quarterly 44.4 (1967): 645-653.
 Biggart, Nicole Woolsey. "Management style as strategic interaction: The case of Governor Ronald Reagan." Journal of Applied Behavioral Science 17.3 (1981): 291-308.
 Biggart,  Nicole Woolsey, and Gary G. Hamilton. "The Power of Obedience" Administrative Science Quarterly 29#4 (1984), pp. 540–549 online

 Boyarsky, Bill. Big Daddy: Jesse Unruh and the art of power politics (U of California Press, 2007) online
 Brands, H.R. Reagan (2015) pp 148–91, a major biography.
 Burbank, Garin. "Governor Reagan and California Welfare Reform: The Grand Compromise of 1971." California History  70.3 (1991): 278-289. online
 Burbank, Garin. "Governor Reagan and Academic Freedom at Berkeley, 1966-1970." Canadian Review of American Studies 20.1 (1989): 17-30.
 Burbank, Garin. "Speaker Moretti, Governor Reagan, and the Search for Tax Reform in California, 1970-1972." Pacific Historical Review 61.2 (1992): 193-214. online
 Burbank, Garin. "Governor Reagan's Only Defeat: The Proposition 1 Campaign in 1973." California History 72.4 (1993): 360-373. online
 Cannon, Lou. Governor Reagan: His rise to power (PublicAffairs, 2005).
 Cannon, Lou (2001), Ronald Reagan: The Presidential Portfolio (PublicAffairs, 2001)
 Cannon, Lou. "Preparing for the Presidency: The Political Education of Ronald Reagan" in A Legacy of Leadership: Governors and American History ed. by Clayton McClure Brooks (2008) pp 137–155. online
 Clabaugh, Gary K. "The educational legacy of Ronald Reagan." Educational Horizons 82.4 (2004): 256-259. online
 Crafton, William. "The incremental revolution: Ronald Reagan and welfare reform in the 1970s." Journal of Policy History 26.1 (2014): 27-47.
 Dallek,  Matthew. The Right Moment: Ronald Reagan's First Victory and the Decisive Turning Point in American Politics (2000), 1966 election;
 De Groot, Gerard J. "‘A Goddamned Electable Person’: The 1966 California Gubernatorial Campaign of Ronald Reagan." History 82#267 (1997) pp: 429-448 online.
 De Groot, Gerard J. "Ronald Reagan and Student Unrest in California, 1966-1970." Pacific Historical Review 65.1 (1996): 107-129. online
 de Wit, Maywa Montenegro, et al. "Agrarian origins of authoritarian populism in the United States: What can we learn from 20th-century struggles in California and the Midwest?" Journal of Rural Studies 82 (2021): 518-530. online

 Edwards, Anne.  Early Reagan: The Rise to Power (New York, 1987), includes 1966 election.
 Farber, Daniel A. "The conservative as environmentalist: from Goldwater and the early Reagan to the 21st century." Arizona Law Review  59 (2017): 1005+ online.

 Hamilton, Gary G., and Nicole Woolsey Biggart. Governor Reagan, Governor Brown: A sociology of executive power (Columbia University Press, 1984)
 Holden, Kenneth. Making of the Great Communicator: Ronald Reagan's Transformation From Actor To Governor (2013)
 Karol, David, and Chloe N. Thurston. "From personal to partisan: Abortion, party, and religion among California state legislators." Studies in American Political Development 34.1 (2020): 91-109. online

 Keefe, David E. "Governor Reagan, welfare reform, and AFDC fertility." Social Service Review 57.2 (1983): 234-253. online
 Kengor, Paul, and Patricia Clark Doerner. The Judge: William P. Clark, Ronald Reagan's Top Hand (Ignatius Press, 2007).
 Kirst, Michael W. “Coalition Building For School Finance Reform: The Case of California.” Journal of Education Finance 4#1 (1978), pp. 29–45 online
 Klingbeil, Matthew W., John Clyde Russell, and Mary E. Stuckey. "The Oratory of Ronald Reagan." in Republican Orators from Eisenhower to Trump (2018) pp: 87-104.

 McKenna, Kevin. "The 'Total Campaign': How Ronald Reagan Overwhelmingly Won the California Gubernatorial Election of 1966." (Thesis, Columbia University, 2010) online.
 Marez, Curtis. "Ronald Reagan, the College Movie: Political Demonology, Academic Freedom, and the University of California" Critical Ethnic Studies 2#1 (2016), pp. 148–180. online
 Mitchell, Daniel JB. "Governor Reagan's ballot box budgeting: One that got away." Southern California Quarterly 89.2 (2007): 195-227. online
 Neill, Shirley Boes. "The Reagan Education Record in California" The Phi Delta Kappan 62#2 (Oct 1980), pp. 136–138 online
 Pawel, Miriam. The Browns of California: The Family Dynasty that Transformed a State and Shaped a Nation (2018)
 Putnam, Jackson K. "Governor Reagan: A Reappraisal." California History (2006): 24-45.online
 Putnam, Jackson K. Jess: The Political Career of Jesse Marvin Unruh (UP of America, 2005).
 Reed, Thomas C. The Reagan Enigma: 1964-1980 (Figueroa Press, 2014).

 Reeves, Michelle. "Obey the Rules or Get Out": Ronald Reagan's 1966 Gubernatorial Campaign and the 'Trouble in Berkeley'." Southern California Quarterly (2010): 275-305. in JSTOR
 Rorabaugh, W. J. Berkeley at War: The 1960s (1990).
 Schuparra, Kurt. Triumph of the Right: The Rise of the California Conservative Movement, 1945-1966 (ME Sharpe, 1998)
 Schuparra, Kurt. "Reagan's Gubernatorial Years: From Conservative Spokesperson to National Politician" in Andrew L. Johns. ed., A Companion to Ronald Reagan (2015) pp 40–53. https://doi.org/10.1002/9781118607770.ch3
 Smith, Craig R. "Ronald Reagan’s rhetorical re-invention of conservatism." Quarterly Journal of Speech 103.1-2 (2017): 33-65.
 Spitz, Bob. Reagan: An American Journey (2018) 880pp; detailed biography.

Primary sources
 Brown, Edmund G. Reagan and Reality: The Two Californias. (1970)
 Deaver, Michael K. A Different Drummer: My Thirty Years with Ronald Reagan (2001)  excerpt
 Kerr, Clark et al.  "Reagan and the Regents" in  The Gold and the Blue: A Personal Memoir of the University of California, 1949–1967 (2003) 2:283–302 online
 Knott, Stephen, and Jeffrey Chidester, eds. At Reagan's Side: Insiders' Recollections from Sacramento to the White House (2009)
 Meese III, Edwin. With Reagan: The Inside Story (1992) excerpt.
 Reagan, Nancy. My Turn: The Memoirs of Nancy Reagan'' (1989)  excerpt. H.W. Brands (2015) p. 743 says "she wrote one of the most candid and at times self-critical memoirs in recent American political history."

Ronald Reagan
Reagan, Ronald, Governorship of
Reagan, Ronald
1960s in California
1970s in California
Reagan
Early lives of the presidents of the United States